Avery Williams may refer to:

 Avery Williams (linebacker) (born 1994), American football player
 Avery Williams (running back) (born 1998), American football player

See also 
 Avery Williamson (born 1992), American football linebacker
 William Avery (disambiguation)